Stumbo is a song by Wiseblood, written by Roli Mosimann and J. G. Thirlwell. It was released as a single in November 1986 by K.422 and was included on the album Dirtdish.

Formats and track listing 
All songs written by Roli Mosimann and J. G. Thirlwell
UK 12" single (WISE 212)
"Stumbo" – 6:35
"Someone Drowned in My Pool" – 7:40

Personnel
Adapted from the Motorslug liner notes.
Wiseblood
 Roli Mosimann – instruments
 J. G. Thirlwell – vocals, instruments, engineering
Production and additional personnel
 Wiseblood – production

Charts

Release history

References

External links 
 
 Stumbo at foetus.org

1986 songs
1986 singles
Wiseblood (band) songs
Songs written by JG Thirlwell
Song recordings produced by JG Thirlwell